The "Appeal to womanhood throughout the world" (later known as "Mothers' Day Proclamation") by Julia Ward Howe was an appeal for women to unite for peace in the world. Written in 1870, Howe's "Appeal to womanhood" was a pacifist reaction to the carnage of the American Civil War and the Franco-Prussian War. The appeal was tied to Howe's feminist conviction that women had a responsibility to shape their societies at the political level.

The original Mothers' Day Proclamation, Julia Ward Howe 1870

“Arise, then… women of this day!
Arise, all women who have hearts,
whether our baptism be that of water or of tears!
Say firmly:
We will not have great questions decided by irrelevant agencies.
Our husbands shall not come to us, reeking with carnage,
for caresses and applause.
Our sons shall not be taken from us to unlearn
all that we have been able to teach them of charity, mercy and patience.
We, women of one country, will be too tender of those of another country
to allow our sons to be trained to injure theirs.

From the bosom of the devastated earth a voice goes up with our own.
It says:  Disarm, Disarm!
The sword of murder is not the balance of justice.
Blood does not wipe out dishonor,
nor violence vindicate possession.
As men have often forsaken the plough and the anvil
at the summons of war,
let women now leave all that may be left of home
for a great and earnest day of council.

Let them meet first, as women, to bewail and commemorate the dead.
Let them then solemnly take council with each other as to the means
whereby the great human family can live in peace,
each bearing after his own kind the sacred impress, not of Caesar,
but of God.

In the name of womanhood and of humanity, I earnestly ask
that a general congress of women, without limit of nationality,
may be appointed and held at some place deemed most convenient,
and at the earliest period consistent with its objects,
to promote the alliance of the different nationalities,
the amicable settlement of international questions,
the great and general interests of peace.“

~ Julia Ward Howe

In 1872 Howe asked for the celebration of a "Mothers' Day for Peace" on 2 June of every year, but she was unsuccessful.<ref name="leigh"> citing Deborah Pickman Clifford, Mine Eyes Have Seen the Glory: A Biography of Julia Ward Howe (Boston: Little, Brown, 1979), 187, 207, and Julia Ward Howe, "How the Fourth of July Should Be Celebrated", Forum 15 (July 1983); 574</ref> The modern Mother's Day, was established by Anna Jarvis 36 years later.  While the day she established was different in significance from what Howe had proposed, Anna Jarvis was reportedly inspired by her mother's work with Howe.

Today, an edited version of the appeal is included in the Unitarian Universalist hymnal Singing the Living Tradition''.

Appeal to womanhood throughout the world

References

Hymns
1870 documents
Pacifism
Proclamations
Feminism
Mother's Day